Balansia is a genus of fungi in the family Clavicipitaceae.

Species from this genus have been found to produce an ergopeptine otherwise unknown in nature, and based upon this discovery it was subsequently named ergobalansine

References

Sordariomycetes genera
Clavicipitaceae
Taxa named by Carlo Luigi Spegazzini